Bash Mahalleh (also Romanized as Bāsh Maḩalleh and Bāsh Maḩaleh) is a village in Sangar Rural District, in the Central District of Faruj County, North Khorasan Province, Iran. At the 2006 census, its population was 661, in 167 families.

References 

Populated places in Faruj County